HMS Pelican was an 18-gun  of the Royal Navy, launched in August 1812. She is perhaps best known for her capture  in August 1813 of the brig . When the navy sold Pelican in 1865 she was the last Cruizer-class vessel still in service.

War of 1812

Pelican was commissioned under Commander John Fordyce Maples on 11 December 1812 for the Irish station. On 5 May 1813 Pelican captured the American schooner Neptune's Barge. Neptune's Barge had been sailing from Connecticut to Santiago de Cuba. Pelican sent her into Jamaica.

Pelican was engaged in convoy escort duty to and from Britain. On 10 August 1813 she arrived in Cork, Ireland, having escorted a convoy from the West Indies. At the time Argus was raiding in British waters and two days later Pelican sailed to join the hunt for the American. On 14 August  Pelican engaged Argus off St David's Head on the Pembrokeshire coast. After an engagement lasting 45 minutes Pelican was in a position to board, at which point Argus struck. Pelican had lost two men killed and five wounded; Fordyce estimated American losses as 40 killed and wounded. In 1847 the Admiralty awarded the Naval General Service Medal with clasp "Pelican 14 Augt. 1813" to the four surviving claimants from the action.

Later that month Commander Thomas Mansell replaced Maples. On 13 January 1814 Pelican captured the American privateer Siro (or Sero) after a chase of 12 hours. Siro was a schooner out of Baltimore, armed with 12 guns. She had a crew of 50 men under Captain D. Gray. Captain Thomas Mansell described Siro in a letter as being pierced for 16 guns though carrying twelve 9-pounders, and new and a fast sailer.

Pelican shared the salvage money by agreement with Castillian. Then on 21 March Pelican recaptured Nossa Senhora de Monte and Jupiter.  was in company with Pelican.

Later in 1814, Pelican was in Lisbon. At some point Commander William Bamber replaced Mansell, only to have Commander Thomas Pricket replace him in December.

Post-war
On 8 August 1826 Captain Charles Leonard Irby took command of Pelican while she was fitting out for the Mediterranean station. On 3 January 1827 her boats captured the pirate schooner Aphrodite in the Gulf of Kalamata, near Scardamoula. Aphrodite was armed with four guns and had a crew of 40 men. She was also carrying a large quantity of plundered goods.

Irby wrote to the Greek governor of Maina — Giovanni Mavromicali — instructing him to bring his galliot and an Ionian prize to Zante to have their papers checked. Irby had warned Mavromicali that should the papers not be in order the British would seize both vessels, and should Mavromicali fail to comply, he should send his women and children into the mountains as the Royal Navy would be compelled to destroy his houses. Irby also asked Mavromicalli to surrender two pirates, Niccolo Coccoici and Niccolo Sciutto.

At Zante Williams learned that Mavromicali had  failed in his pledge to accede to Irby's instructions. Zebra sailed on 30 January in search of Mavromicali, and on 8 February she captured the galliot.

During a voyage from Hong Kong to Portsmouth, Hampshire, Pelican ran aground on the Peel Bank in the English Channel off the coast of Hampshire on 13 January 1845. She was refloated the next day and taken in to Portsmouth.

Fate
The Admiralty transferred Pelican to the Coast Guard in 1850, and she stayed at Rye, East Sussex until 1865. In Coast Guard service she was renamed CGWV 29 (Coast Guard Watch Vessel). She was sold at Rye to Mr. Fryman on 7 June 1865.

Notes, citations, and references
Notes

Citations

References

 
 

 

1812 ships
Ships built on the River Exe
Cruizer-class brig-sloops
War of 1812 ships of the United Kingdom
Maritime incidents in January 1845